This is a list of the best results achieved by athletes from different nations at four major competitions where swimming events are (or were) competed. Results are based on major competitions according to FINA's historical records: the swimming and open water swimming events at the Olympic Games, the swimming and open water swimming events at the FINA World Aquatics Championships, the FINA Short Course Swimming World Championships and the defunct FINA World Open Water Swimming Championships. The results listed here only refer to swimming and open water swimming events. Medals earned by athletes from defunct NOCs or historical teams have been merged with the results achieved by their immediate successor states, as follows: Russia inherits medals from the Soviet Union and the Unified Team (but they are not combined in accordance with the IOC rules); Serbia inherits medals from Yugoslavia; Australia inherits medals from Australasia; and Germany inherits medals from West Germany and East Germany (they are not combined). The table is pre-sorted by total number of medals, then most gold medal results, silver medal results and bronze medal results, respectively. When equal ranks are given, countries are listed in alphabetical order.

Results

See also 
 List of major achievements in sports by nation

References 

History of swimming
Swimming

Swimming statistics